Anastasia Valerievna Afanasieva (born 1982) is a Ukrainian physician as well as a Russian-speaking poet, writer, and translator.

Biography
Anastasia Valerievna Afanasieva was born in 1982, in Kharkiv. She graduated from Kharkiv National Medical University, and works as a physician at a psychiatric ward.

Afanasieva's poems, prose, and articles on modern poetry have been published in magazines, and other publications, including the anthologies, Babylon and Union of Writers. She is the author of the poetry collections, Poor White People (2005), Voices Speak (2007), White Walls (2010), White Soldier, Black Soldier (2010), Empty Bullet (2012), and Imprints (2014). Audio collections of her works include, White there, white here (3 CDs, 2011).

Afanasieva is the winner of the Retz Magazine Prize (2005), the Russian Prize (2006), the LiteratRRentgen Prize (2007) and others. She was shortlisted for the Debut Award (2003). Her poems have been translated into Belarusian, English, German, Italian, and Ukrainian.

Awards
 Short-listed, Debut Prize in Poetry (2003)
 Short-listed, Debut Prize in Criticism (2004)
 Winner, Russian Prize in poetry (2006)

Publications

Poetry collections
 Poor White People (Moscow, 2005)
 Voices Speak (Moscow, 2007)
 White Walls (2010)
 White Soldier, Black Soldier (2010)
 Empty Bullet (2012)
 Imprints (2014)

Notes

References

1982 births
Living people
Writers from Kharkiv
21st-century Ukrainian poets
Ukrainian women poets
Ukrainian writers in Russian
21st-century Ukrainian physicians
Physicians from Kharkiv